Lundellianthus is a genus of Mesoamerican flowering plants in the tribe Heliantheae within the family Asteraceae.

 Species
 Lundellianthus belizeanus (B.L.Turner) Strother - Belize
 Lundellianthus breedlovei (B.L.Turner) Strother - Chiapas
 Lundellianthus guatemalensis (Donn.Sm.) Strother - Guatemala, Belize, Chiapas, Quintana Roo, El Salvador
 Lundellianthus harrimanii Strother - Nicaragua, Honduras
 Lundellianthus jaliscensis (McVaugh) Strother - Jalisco
 Lundellianthus kingii (H.Rob.) Strother - Guatemala
 Lundellianthus salvinii (Hemsl.) Strother - Guatemala, Honduras, Chiapas
 Lundellianthus steyermarkii (S.F.Blake) Strother - Guatemala

References

Asteraceae genera
Heliantheae
Flora of North America